Virattu/Dega is a 2014 Indian bilingual thriller film produced and directed by Kumar T. The film stars T Kumar's son Sujiv and Erica Fernandes, while Pragya Jaiswal and Manobala appear in other pivotal roles. The Tamil version of the film was released on 21 February 2014 to average reviews, while the Telugu version Dega was released on 28 November 2014.

Cast
Sujiv as Sujiv
Erica Fernandes as Sri
Pragya Jaiswal as Mavi
Manobala
Suman Setty
Amit Tiwari
Shankar Melkote

Production
Sequences were filmed on a train travelling from Thailand to Malaysia and the stunt scenes were composed by Dho Dho of Thailand and Williams of Malaysia. Further scenes were canned in New Zealand.

Release
The film opened on 21 March 2014 to average reviews.

Music

The film's audio was released in June 2013 by R. B. Choudary, while S. J. Surya received the first copy at a launch event. The film has four songs with four different lyricists contributing – Madhan Karky, Na. Muthukumar, Vignesh Shivan and Lallu. The film's soundtrack opened to average reviews, with a music critic noting it was as "mercurial as its composer". The song "Podhum Podhum" was released with a promotional video featuring the lead singers Andrea Jeremiah and Naresh Iyer and was well received by critics.

References

Indian thriller films
2014 films
2010s Telugu-language films
2010s Tamil-language films
Indian multilingual films
Films scored by Dharan Kumar
2014 thriller films
2014 multilingual films